Choi Seok-jeong (1646–1715) was a Korean politician and mathematician in the Joseon period of Korea. 

He published the Gusuryak in 1700, the first known literature on Latin squares, predating Leonhard Euler by at least 67 years. He also invented the hexagonal tortoise problem. Choi was a member of the Jeonju Choe clan.

Choi Seok-jeong Award
The Choi Seok-jeong Award was created in 2021 to recognize those who develop or spread mathematics. Spelling of laureates' names matches their Wikipedia page, if it exists, the remainder used Revised Romanization of Korean with the Korean Romanization Converter of Al Lab and Narainfotech.

References

Korean mathematicians
1646 births
1715 deaths
18th-century Korean mathematicians
17th-century Korean mathematicians
Seok-jeong